2 Kings 17 is the seventeenth chapter of the second part of the  Books of Kings in the Hebrew Bible or the Second Book of Kings in the Old Testament of the Christian Bible. The book is a compilation of various annals recording the acts of the kings of Israel and Judah by a Deuteronomic compiler in the seventh century BCE, with a supplement added in the sixth century BCE. This chapter records the events during the reigns of Hoshea the last king of Israel, the capture of Samaria and the deportation of the northern kingdom population by the Assyrians.

Text
This chapter was originally written in the Hebrew language. It is divided into 41 verses.

Textual witnesses
Some early manuscripts containing the text of this chapter in Hebrew are of the Masoretic Text tradition, which includes the Codex Cairensis (895), and Codex Leningradensis (1008).

There is also a translation into Koine Greek known as the Septuagint, made in the last few centuries BCE. Extant ancient manuscripts of the Septuagint version include Codex Vaticanus (B; B; 4th century) and Codex Alexandrinus (A; A; 5th century).

Structure
This chapter can be divided into the following sections:
 : Regnal account of Hoshea ben Elah of Israel and the fall of Samaria
 : Theological analysis
 : Interpretation of the situation in Samaria after the dispersion of Israel

The skeletal narrative structure in this chapter is shaped by the actions of the king of Assyria, with the narrative followed by the commentary (twice): 
 direct attack on Israel (verses 1–23)
narrative (verses (1–6)
commentary (verses 7–23)
indirect attack on Israel (verses 24–41)
narrative (verses 24–28)
commentary (verses 29–41)

Analysis
This chapter provides a significant theological interpretation of Israel history connecting the long chronicles of the sin of the nation to the resulting divine punishment with the fall of the northern kingdom, as reflected by a 'dense concentration of Deuteronomistic language'. The northern prophets, Amos and Hosea, provide additional reflection on the reasons for the judgment.

Hoshea, king of Israel (17:1–6)
The regnal records of Hoshea, the last king of Israel, is evaluated less negatively than the previous kings of the northern kingdom, but his deeds are still 'evil in the sight of the Lord.' Hoshea's shift of allegiance from Assyria to Egypt has a disastrous consequence. Shalmaneser V, the king of Assyria, soon went up against Hoshea and laid siege on Samaria that last for three years, but Sargon II made the claim in his annals to have taken Samaria (ANET 284–285).

Verse 1
In the twelfth year of Ahaz king of Judah reigned hath Hoshea son of Elah in Samaria, over Israel -- nine years.
"In the 12th year of Ahaz": According to McFall in the correction of  Thiele's chronology, this fell between September 724 BCE and September 723  BCE and during this period Hoshea "has reigned" in Samaria for 9 years, following "accession year method". Most English versions translated the verb as "began to reign", treating the year as terminus a quo.
Following Thiele-McFall chronology, Hoshea died between April and September 723 BCE when Assyria captured Samaria.

Verse 3
Against him came up Shalmaneser king of Assyria. And Hoshea became his vassal and paid him tribute.
"Shalmaneser": is identified as Shalmaneser V.

Verse 4

And the king of Assyria found conspiracy in Hoshea: for he had sent messengers to So king of Egypt, and brought no present to the king of Assyria, as he had done year by year: therefore the king of Assyria shut him up, and bound him in prison.
"So king of Egypt": identified mostly with "Osorkon IV" (reigned 730 – 715/13 BCE), or other rulers including Pharaoh Shabaka of Egypt (710-696 BCE), Silhu (a north Arabian monarch; Šanda 214–16), Sibe (an Egyptian officer) and Pharaoh Tefnakhte (reigned 726-716 BCE) whose capital, Sais (sʼw), could be transliterated as "So" in Hebrew.

Verse 6

In the ninth year of Hoshea, the king of Assyria captured Samaria, and he carried the Israelites away to Assyria and placed them in Halah, and on the Habor, the river of Gozan, and in the cities of the Medes.
"In the 9th year of Hoshea" according to Thiele-McFall chronology, Samaria was captured  between April and September 723 BCE.
"The king of Assyria": although the siege was started by Shalmaneser V, his successor, Sargon II, claimed to have taken the city of Samaria and oversaw the deportation of northern Israel's people (ANET 284–285). The event and succession of Assyrian kings are recorded in one of the Babylonian Chronicles (ABC 1; "From Nabu-Nasir to Šamaš-šuma-ukin").

The deportees were displaced decentrally to various location in the north-east Syria, effectively destroying the races, so the exiled northern Israelite people left few traces in history and tradition (becoming "Ten Lost Tribes" of Israel), unlike the Jews (the people of Judah) who were later moved en bloc to Babylon.

Theological cause of the catastrophe (17:7–23)
The exposition in this section consists of two parts: about Israel (verses 7–18) and involving Judah (verses 19–23). The first part is marked by the term "because" of verse 7 to the "therefore" in the beginning of verse 18:
A  general indictment (verses 7–8)
B  specific crimes (verses (9–12)
C  prophetic warning unheeded (verses 13–14)
A'  general indictment (verses 15–16a)
B'  specific crimes (verses 16b–17)
C'  result (verse 18)
In the second part, the idolatry in kingdom of Judah is coordinated with that in the northern kingdom (verse 19; cf. verse 13), although the narrator at this point only hints the demise of Judah (as the punishment for its sins).

The immigrants from the east and their cults (17:24–41)

Following the principle of destroying races in the conquered territory, the Assyrians not only displaced the Israelites from their land, but also deported people from other lands into Israel. The places listed in verses 24, 29–41 are partly in Mesopotamia and partly in Syria.. This mixing of ethnicity would avoid the development of large-scale resistance and 'paralyse the regions using the tension between people' of different origins. The Deuteronomistic narrative focuses on the religious impacts of this policy, that 'the religion (gods and ritual traditions) in the province of Samaria 'became mixed'. It is noted that the worship of YHWH still exists, but 'united syncretistically' with other religions (verses 32–34, 41), as explained using the episode recorded in verses 25–28.

See also

 Related Bible parts: 2 Kings 16, 2 Kings 18, 2 Chronicles 27, 2 Chronicles 28

Notes

References

Sources

External links
 Jewish translations:
 Melachim II - II Kings - Chapter 17 (Judaica Press) translation [with Rashi's commentary] at Chabad.org
 Christian translations:
 Online Bible at GospelHall.org (ESV, KJV, Darby, American Standard Version, Bible in Basic English)
 2 Kings chapter 17. Bible Gateway

17